One Man Law is a 1931 American pre-Code Western film directed by Lambert Hillyer. The film stars Buck Jones, Shirley Grey, and Robert Ellis. It was produced and distributed by Columbia Pictures. It was filmed on location at the Walker Ranch in Placerita Canyon.

Cast

 Buck Jones as Brand Thompson
 Shirley Grey as Grace Duncan
 Robert Ellis as Jonathan P. Streeter
 Murdock Mcquarrie as Grimm
 Harry Todd as Hank
 Henry Sedley as Dye
 Ernie Adams as Stubb
 Richard Alexander as Sorenson

Plot
A sheriff finds out about a real-estate scam and stops it.

References

External links
 

1931 films
American black-and-white films
1931 Western (genre) films
American Western (genre) films
Films directed by Lambert Hillyer
1930s American films
Columbia Pictures films
1930s English-language films